Herbert John Handt (born May 26, 1926) is an American operatic tenor and later conductor, particularly known for his conducting and editions of rarely performed Italian scores. Handt was born in Philadelphia, Pennsylvania, and studied at the Juilliard School of Music and the Vienna Academy of Music. He made his debut as a singer at the Vienna State Opera in 1949 and his debut as a conductor in Rome in 1960. Handt turned 95 in May 2021.

Roles created
In his career as a tenor, Handt created roles in three 20th-century operas:
Don Giovanni Mediana in Malipiero's Venere prigioniera  (Teatro della Pergola, Florence, 14 May 1957)
Zuckertanz in Menotti's Maria Golovin (Theatre of the US Pavillon, Brussels World's Fair, 20 August 1958)
Primo omuncolo in Roberto Lupi's  Persefone  (Teatro Comunale, Florence, 9 January 1970)

External Links
Herbert Handt sings Franz Schubert's "Schwanengesang" D. 957. A recital for French radio RTF on 29 January 1961. Hélène Boschi is the pianist.

References

1926 births
Living people
American male conductors (music)
American operatic tenors
Juilliard School alumni
University of Music and Performing Arts Vienna alumni
20th-century American male opera singers
Musicians from Philadelphia
Singers from Pennsylvania
Classical musicians from Pennsylvania
20th-century American conductors (music)